A chrestomathy (from the Ancient Greek  (“desire of learning”) =  (“useful”) +  (“learn”)) is a collection of selected literary passages (usually from a single author); a selection of literary passages from a foreign language assembled for studying the language; or a text in various languages, used especially as an aid in learning a subject.

In philology or in the study of literature, it is a type of reader which presents a sequence of example texts, selected to demonstrate the development of language or literary style. It is different from an anthology because of its didactic purpose.

Examples 
 Bernhard Dorn, A Chrestomathy of the Pushtu or Afghan language, St. Petersburg: 1847
 Mencken, H. L., A Mencken Chrestomathy, His Own Selection of his Choicest Writing, New York: Alfred P. Knopf, 1949
 Zamenhof, L. L., Fundamenta Krestomatio de la Lingvo Esperanto, Paris: Hachette, 1903
 Edward Ullendorff, A Tigrinya Chrestomathy, Stuttgart: Steiner Werlag Wiesbaden GmbH, 1985.
 Bilingual Greek-Latin Grammar, by Georgios Dimitriou, 1785, that contained personal observations, Epistles and Maxims, as well as biographies of notable men.
 Rosetta Code, "a programming chrestomathy site," which "present[s] solutions to the same task in as many different [computer] languages as possible."
 The Ibis Chrestomathy, dealing "solely with words that have a claim to naturalization within the English language."
 Heather Christle, The Crying Book, Catapult: 2019. Explores the subject of crying and tears in a numbered series of extremely short essays.

See also 
 Use of the Lord's Prayer as a language comparison tool
 Parallel text
 Text corpus

References

Anthologies